Benjamin Gorham (February 13, 1775 – September 27, 1855) was a U.S. Representative from Massachusetts.

He was the son of Nathaniel Gorham, who served as one of the Presidents of the Continental Congress. Benjamin was born in Charlestown in the Province of Massachusetts Bay. He pursued preparatory studies, graduated from Harvard University in 1795, and studied law. When he was admitted to the bar he commenced practice in Boston. From 1814 to 1818 he served as a member of the Massachusetts House of Representatives and then turned to the Massachusetts State Senate, where he served from May 26, 1819 until he resigned on January 10, 1821. He was elected as a Democratic-Republican to the Sixteenth Congress to fill the vacancy caused by the resignation of Jonathan Mason; he was re-elected when the term expired, and served until March 3, 1823.

Afterwards he returned to the State senate for one term beginning May 28, 1823, before being elected as an Adams candidate to the Twentieth Congress to fill the vacancy caused by the resignation of Daniel Webster and then reelected as an Anti-Jacksonian to the Twenty-first Congress and served from July 23, 1827, to March 3, 1831. After a term filled by Nathan Appleton, he was elected as an Anti-Jacksonian to the Twenty-third Congress (March 4, 1833 - March 3, 1835). Afterward he served again a member of the State house of representatives in 1841 and resumed the practice of law.

He died in Boston in 1855, aged 80, and was interred in the Phipps Street Burying Ground in Charlestown.

References 

1775 births
1855 deaths
Harvard University alumni
Massachusetts lawyers
Massachusetts state senators
Members of the Massachusetts House of Representatives
Politicians from Boston
Massachusetts National Republicans
American people of English descent
19th-century American politicians
Democratic-Republican Party members of the United States House of Representatives from Massachusetts
National Republican Party members of the United States House of Representatives
Burials in Boston
19th-century American lawyers